Tarik Saleh (born 28 January 1972) is a Swedish television producer, animator, publisher, journalist and film director. He was born in Högalids församling, Stockholm to a Swedish mother and an Egyptian father. In the late 1980s and early 1990s, he was one of Sweden's most prominent graffiti artists, including co-creating Fascinate. He has also worked as a TV host for Sveriges Television and is one of the founders of production company Atmo.

At the 53rd Guldbagge Awards, his film The Nile Hilton Incident won five awards, including Best Film. His film Boy from Heaven was selected to compete for the Palme d'Or at the 2022 Cannes Film Festival.

His work often contains techniques such as montages, cut-out graphics and faces with manipulated lip synching.

Filmography 
Feature films
 Metropia (2009)
 Tommy (2014)
 The Nile Hilton Incident (2017)
The Contractor (2022)
 Boy from Heaven (2022)
Documentary films
 Sacrificio: Who Betrayed Che Guevara (2001)
 Gitmo: The New Rules of War (2005)
Television episodes
 Westworld (2018)
 Ray Donovan (2018)
Music videos
Sadness is a Blessing: Lykke Li (2011)
 Lykke Li - "I Follow Rivers" (2011)
 Lykke Li - "No Rest for the Wicked" (2014)

References

External links
 
 
 Short biography at Atmo.se

1972 births
Living people
Artists from Stockholm
Journalists from Stockholm
Swedish animators
Swedish film directors
Swedish animated film directors
Swedish animated film producers
Swedish graffiti artists
Swedish people of Egyptian descent
Swedish television journalists
Cannes Film Festival Award for Best Screenplay winners